Maton is a surname. Notable people with the surname include:

 Georges Maton (1913–1998), French cyclist
 Mathieu Maton (born 1981), French footballer
 Nick Maton (born 1997), American baseball player
 Phil Maton (born 1993), American baseball player
 Polly Maton (born 1999), British para-sprinter
 William George Maton (1774–1835), English physician